The 2014–15 Providence Friars women's basketball team will represent Providence College in the 2014–15 college basketball season. The Friars are led by third year head coach Susan Robinson Fruchtl and were members of the Big East Conference. The Friars will play their home games at Alumni Hall. They finished the season 6–24, 3–15 in Big East play to finish in ninth place. They lost in the first round of the Big East women's tournament to Marquette.

Roster

Schedule

|-
!colspan=9 style="background:#C0C0C0; color:#000000;"| Regular Season

|-
!colspan=9 style="background:#000000;"| Big East Women's Tournament

References

Providence
Providence Friars women's basketball seasons
Provide
Provide